Gédéon Mundele Ngolo (born 4 August 1994), better known by his stage name Franglish, is a French rapper and singer.

Originating from the 20th arrondissement of Paris and is of Congolese origin}, he was passionate about hip hop, rap, and French and American R&B. After seeing his beginnings, Brownie Dubz Gang collective started calling him Mr. Franglish because of his mixed freestyle. He collaborated greatly with the rap group BFBC originating from Montfermeil. In 2013, he released his own Franglish Prototype, followed in 2017 with a second mixtape Changement d'ambiance and a third in 2017 as Signature. His album Monsieur reached number 16 on the French Albums chart in 2019. His biggest single hit was "My Salsa" featuring Tory Lanez.

Discography

Albums

Mixtapes

Singles

Featured singles

Other charted songs

References

Rappers from Paris
French male singers
1994 births
Living people